Alexander Nikolaevich Deutsch (Aleksandr Nikolaevič Dejč; ; December 31, 1899 – 22 November 1986) was a Soviet astronomer who worked at Pulkovo Observatory.

Deutsch was born in the night from December 31, 1899, to January 1, 1900, in the Bessarabian town of Reni in a family of Volga German (on his father's side), Greek and Romanian (on his mother's side) descent. When he was a small child, the family moved to Ryazan and then to Saratov. He was graduated from the Sankt Petersburg University (Russia). He was an adjoint director of the Pulkovo Observatory prior World War II and the director of the Pulkovo Observatory during the blockade of Leningrad. Subsequently, he was the head of the astrometry section of the Pulkovo Observatory and the founder of the astrometric school of that observatory.

He was active 1935–1985 as A. N. Deutsch (A. Deutsch published starting in 1926 and could be the same person). He discovered one asteroid (the Minor Planet Center lists him as A. Deutsch).

His main scientific contributions refer to stars' proper motions in selected Kapteyn surfaces, astrophotography of galaxies and stars, brown dwarfs, astronomical calculations of the coordinates of warships, eclipses and asteroids photography. A number of papers were signed as Deich. Deutsch (Deich) was а president of the IAU Astrometry commission. The asteroid Reni, discovered by L. S. Chernyh, was named in honor of A. N. Deutsch (Deich).

Papers 
 ADS NASA

References

External links 
 Biography from the website of Pulkovo observatory (in Russian)
 Gaina Alex: A.N. Deutsch (Deich) - 110 years of Birthday (Biography and Bibliography)

1899 births
1986 deaths
People from Odesa Oblast
Recipients of the Order of the Red Banner of Labour

Discoverers of minor planets
Soviet people of German descent
Soviet people of Greek descent
Soviet people of Romanian descent
Soviet astronomers